The Battle of Kalimanci was a battle fought between the Kingdom of Serbia and the Kingdom of Bulgaria during the Second Balkan War. The battle started on the 18th and ended on the 19th of July 1913. The Bulgarian Army stopped the Serbian Army from pushing them out of Macedonia and joining up with the Greek Army downstream of the river Struma.  The battle ended in an important Bulgarian defensive victory.

Background
At the Battle of Bregalnica, fought 30 June  – 8 July 1913, the Bulgarian army was decisively defeated by the Serbian Army.

Battle
On 13 July 1913, General Mihail Savov assumed control of the 4th and 5th Bulgarian armies. The Bulgarians then entrenched themselves into strong defensive-positions around the village of Kalimanci, near the Bregalnica River in the northeastern part of Macedonia.

On 18 July, the Serbian 3rd Army attacked, closing in on the Bulgarian positions. The Serbs threw hand grenades at their enemies in an attempt to dislodge the Bulgarians, who were sheltered 40 feet away. The Bulgarians held firm, and on several occasions they allowed the Serbs to advance. When the Serbs were within 200 yards of their trenches, they charged with fixed bayonets and threw them back. The Bulgarian artillery was also very successful in breaking up the Serb attacks. The Bulgarian lines held, an invasion of their homeland was repelled, and their morale grew substantially.

If the Serbs had broken through the Bulgarian defences, they might have doomed the 2nd Bulgarian Army and driven the Bulgarians entirely out of Macedonia. This defensive victory, along with the successes of the 1st and 3rd armies in the north, protected western Bulgaria from a Serbian invasion. Although this victory boosted the Bulgarians, the situation was critical in the south, with the Greek Army defeating the Bulgarians in numerous skirmishes.

Citations

References

 

Battles of the Second Balkan War

Kalimanci
Kalimanci
Kalimanci
Military history of North Macedonia
Conflicts in 1913
1913 in Bulgaria
1913 in Serbia
Vardar Macedonia (1912–1918)
July 1913 events